Herminium biporosum is a species of flowering plant in the family Orchidaceae, native to China (south-central, north-central and Qinghai). It was first described by Karl Maximovich.

References

bisporum
Flora of South-Central China
Flora of North-Central China
Flora of Qinghai